The North and South Men's Amateur Golf Championship, commonly known as the North and South Amateur, is an annual golf tournament held since 1901 at the Pinehurst Resort in Pinehurst, North Carolina, USA. An invitational tournament, participants are chosen based upon their performance in national amateur championships and overall competitive record.

In December 2021, the North and South Amateur joined with six other tournaments to form the Elite Amateur Golf Series.

Winners

2022 Luke Clanton
2021 Louis Dobbelaar
2020 Tyler Strafaci
2019 Cooper Dossey
2018 Ben Schlottman
2017 William Nottingham
2016 Timothy Conover
2015 Sean Walsh
2014 Michael Cromie
2013 Andrew Dorn
2012 Peter Williamson
2011 Jack Fields
2010 Donald Constable
2009 David Chung
2008 Matt Savage
2007 Phillip Mollica
2006 Brady Schnell
2005 Sean Moore
2004 Martin Ureta
2003 Chris Stroud
2002 Eric Jorgensen
2001 Michael Sims
2000 David Eger
1999 James Driscoll
1998 Tim Jackson
1997 Jake Kransteuber
1996 Paul M. Simson
1995 Paul M. Simson
1994 Mark Slawter
1993 Kelly Mitchum
1992 Duane Bock
1991 David Eger
1990 Tom Scherrer
1989 Lee Porter
1988 Ulysses Grisette
1987 Robert Goettlicher
1986 Billy Andrade
1985 Jack Nicklaus II
1984 Davis Love III
1983 Bryan Sullivan
1982 Keith Clearwater
1981 Corey Pavin
1980 Hal Sutton
1979 John McGough
1978 Gary Hallberg
1977 Gary Hallberg
1976 Curtis Strange
1975 Curtis Strange
1974 George Burns
1973 Mike Ford
1972 Danny Edwards
1971 Eddie Pearce
1970 Gary Cowan
1969 Joe Inman
1968 Jack Lewis Jr.
1967 William C. Campbell
1966 Ward Wettlaufer
1965 Tom Draper
1964 Dale Morey
1963 Billy Joe Patton
1962 Billy Joe Patton
1961 Bill Hyndman
1960 Charlie Smith
1959 Jack Nicklaus
1958 Dick Chapman
1957 William C. Campbell
1956 Hillman Robbins
1955 Don Bisplinghoff
1954 Billy Joe Patton
1953 William C. Campbell
1952 Frank Stranahan
1951 Hobart Manley, Jr.
1950 William C. Campbell
1949 Frank Stranahan
1948 Harvie Ward
1947 Charles B. Dudley
1946 Frank Stranahan
1945 Ed Furgol
1944 Mal Galletta
1943 Harry Offutt
1942 George Dunlap
1941 Skip Alexander
1940 George Dunlap
1939 Frank Strafaci
1938 Frank Strafaci
1937 Bobby Dunkelberger
1936 George Dunlap
1935 George Dunlap
1934 George Dunlap
1933 George Dunlap
1932 M. Pierpont Warner
1931 George Dunlap
1930 Eugene V. Homans
1929 George Voight
1928 George Voight
1927 George Voight
1926 Page Hufty
1925 Arthur W. Yates
1924 Fred W. Knight
1923 Frank C. Newton
1922 Henry J. Topping
1921 B. P. Merriman
1920 Francis Ouimet
1919 Edward C. Beall
1918 Irving S. Robeson
1917 Norman H. Maxwell
1916 Philip V. G. Carter
1915 Fillmore K. Robeson
1914 Reginald S. Worthington
1913 Henry J. Topping
1912 Walter Travis
1911 Chick Evans
1910 Walter Travis
1909 James D. Standish, Jr.
1908 Allan Lard
1907 Allan Lard
1906 Warren Wood
1905 L. Lee Harban
1904 Walter Travis
1903 T. Sterling Beckwith
1902 Charles Cory
1901 George C. Dutton

Source:

See also
North and South Open
North and South Women's Amateur Golf Championship

References

External links

Amateur golf tournaments in the United States
Golf in North Carolina
1901 establishments in North Carolina
Recurring sporting events established in 1901